The 2005 New Zealand bravery awards were announced via a special honours list on 29 January 2005, and recognised 26 people, including four posthumously, for acts of bravery between 1999 and 2004.

New Zealand Bravery Star (NZBS)
 Peter James Deam – of Waimate.

 John Bell Fenton Penetama – of Northland.
 Trevor Francis Mokaraka – Northland. Posthumous award.

 Damian Peter John Klavs – of Wellington; constable, New Zealand Police.

 Jeanette Ruth Park – of Marton; sergeant, New Zealand Police.

New Zealand Bravery Decoration (NZBD)
 Geoffrey Frank Knight – of Tapanui; lately constable, New Zealand Police.

 Brian John Pickering – of Rotorua.

New Zealand Bravery Medal (NZBM)
 Roger Terry Blumhardt – of Tūrangi.
 Brendan John Dobbyn – of Tūrangi.
 Kevin Albert Singer – of Tūrangi.

 Patrick Martin John Burke – of Cambridge; lately detective, New Zealand Police.

 Paul Lindsay Chandler – of Akaroa.
 Peter James Duncan – of Christchurch.
 Graham John Watkin Jones – of Christchurch.

 Daniel James Cleaver – of Northland; constable, New Zealand Police.

 Graham Robert Ford – of Auckland; sergeant, New Zealand Police.

 William John (Bill) Gilchrist – of Otago.

 Matthew Hollis – of Palmerston North.

 Sergeant Christopher Mark Jowsey – of Feilding; Royal New Zealand Air Force.

 Ethan James Kennedy – of Whangārei.

 Hamish Everett Neal – Waimate. Posthumous award.

 David Leonard O'Loughlin – of Raglan.

 Mark Charles Smith – of Canterbury

 Caine Francis Spick – of Northland.

 Duncan Taylor – of Feilding; detective constable, New Zealand Police. Posthumous award.

 John Vaughan. Posthumous award

References

Bravery
Bravery awards
New Zealand bravery awards